H. M. Fearnside (died 1964) was an American businessman and politician. He served as a Democratic member of the Florida House of Representatives.

In 1913, Fearnside was elected as mayor of Palatka, Florida. In 1935, Fearnside was elected to the Florida House of Representatives, serving until 1937, and then again from 1939 to 1941.

Fearnside died in 1964 of cancer in Palatka, Florida, at the age of 79.

References 

Year of birth missing
1964 deaths
People from Palatka, Florida
Deaths from cancer in Florida
Democratic Party members of the Florida House of Representatives
20th-century American politicians
Mayors of places in Florida
Businesspeople from Florida